The Campeiro is a breed of small horse from Brazil. It is thought to descend from horses brought to South America in the sixteenth century. Because it has an ambling gait and comes from the area of the Araucária forests of southern Brazil, it may also be known as the Marchador das Araucárias.

History 

The Campeiro is thought to descend from horses lost from the expedition of Álvar Núñez Cabeza de Vaca in 1541 from Santa Catarina Island to the new Spanish settlement at Asunción (now the capital of Paraguay). It is likely that among its ancestors there are also horses lost from other Spanish expeditions in the area. The horses became established as a feral population on the mainland, on the plateaux that are now parts of the states of Santa Catarina, Paraná, and Rio Grande do Sul, and are characterised by the Araucária moist forest biome, where they became very numerous.

The horses were first seen and reported in 1728 by the exploratory expedition of Francisco de Souza e Faria from the coast of Santa Catarina across the plateau in the direction of the settlement of Curitiba (now the capital of Paraná state).

When the first fazendas were established in the area, some of the horses were captured and selectively bred, particularly for their ambling gait, for many generations. A breed association, the Associação Brasileira de Criadores de Cavalo Campeiro, was formed in Curitibanos in 1976. The breed was officially recognised by the Ministério da Agricultura, Pecuária e Abastecimento, the Brazilian ministry of agriculture, in 1985, and a stud-book was opened.

Characteristics 

The most common color is chestnut, followed by bay and gray.

Use 

The Campeiro is suitable for use as a saddle horse or for drawing light loads. It is often used for cattle-herding.

References 

Horse breeds
Horse breeds originating in Brazil